Middleton Incline is a former railway incline in Middleton, Derbyshire. Historically on the Cromford and High Peak Railway. The incline was one of six inclines along the entire line from Cromford to Whaley Bridge in High Peak, Derbyshire. The incline was opened in 1830 and was in use until 1967 when the entire line from Whaley Bridge to Middleton was closed. With the section to Cromford closing in 1963. Today, the incline is used as part of the High Peak Trail. Middleton Pasture Incline was also 1 in 9 gradient. Like the other ones along the former railway.

References 

Railway inclines in the United Kingdom